Heparan sulfate glucosamine 3-O-sulfotransferase 2 is an enzyme that in humans is encoded by the HS3ST2 gene.

Heparan sulfate biosynthetic enzymes are key components in generating a myriad of distinct heparan sulfate fine structures that carry out multiple biologic activities. The enzyme encoded by this gene is a member of the heparan sulfate biosynthetic enzyme family. It is a type II integral membrane protein and possesses heparan sulfate glucosaminyl 3-O-sulfotransferase activity. This gene is expressed predominantly in brain and may play a role in the nervous system.

Role in breast cancer
The HS3ST2 promoter is hypermethylated in breast cancer tissue compared to normal breast ducts, suggesting a potential involvement in the pathogenesis of the disease. Functional analysis revealed that upregulation of HS3ST2 in human breast cancer cells resulted in altered invasiveness, which was due to changes in Mitogen-activated protein kinase signaling and matrix metalloproteinase expression.

References

Further reading